Khan Tengri is a mountain of the Tian Shan mountain range. It is on the China—Kyrgyzstan—Kazakhstan tripoint, east of lake Issyk Kul. For this reason, in mountaineering circles, including for the Soviet Snow Leopard award criteria, it is considered a 7,000-metre peak.

Khan Tengri is the second-highest mountain in the Tian Shan, surpassed only by Jengish Chokusu (means "Victory peak", formerly known as Peak Pobeda) (7,439 m). Khan Tengri is the highest point in Kazakhstan and the third-highest peak in Kyrgyzstan, after Jengish Chokusu (7,439  m) and Avicenna Peak (7,134 m). It is also the world's most northern 7,000-metre peak, notable because peaks of high latitude have a shorter climbing season, generally more severe weather and thinner air.

Names
The name "Khan Tengri" literally means "King Heaven" in Kazakh or "King Sky" in Mongolian and possibly references the deity Tengri that both exist in Pagan Tengrism and Central Asian Buddhism. In some other local languages, it is known as Khan Tangiri Shyngy, Kan-Too Chokusu, Pik Khan-Tengry, and Hantengri Feng. Local residents named the mountain Khan-Tengri for the unique beauty of snow giants.

Features
Khan Tengri is a massive marble pyramid, covered in snow and ice. At sunset the marble glows red, giving it the name "blood mountain" in Kazakh and Kyrgyz. Located just across the South Engilchek (or Inylchek) glacier, 16 km north of Jengish Chokusu, Khan Tengri was originally thought to be the highest peak in the Tian Shan because of its dramatic, steep shape, compared to the massive bulk of Jengish Chokusu. This perception was probably also due to Khan Tengri's visibility across the plains of southern Kazakhstan while Jengish Chokusu remains out of view of civilization. Khan Tengri is the highest peak in the rugged Tengri Tag subrange, also known as the Mustag, that also contains Chapaev Peak and Gorky Peak. Anatoli Boukreev considered Khan Tengri perhaps the world's most beautiful peak because of its geometric ridges and its symmetry.

History
Although it is almost 430 m (1,500 ft) lower than its neighbor, Khan Tengri was believed to be the highest peak in the range until Jengish Chokusu was surveyed in 1943 and determined to be higher.

Peter Semenov was the first European to see the Tengri Tag and its peak, the colossal Khan Tengri (in 1857).

The first ascent of the peak was made in 1931 by ’s Ukrainian team through a route from the south (Kyrgyzstan side), then along the west ridge. M. Kuzmin's team made the first ascent from the north (Kazakhstan side) in 1964. Khan Tengri is one of five peaks that a Soviet mountaineer needed to scale to earn the prestigious Snow Leopard award.

Anatoli Boukreev achieved the first solo speed ascent in 1990.

A team from Kazakhstan made the first winter ascent of Khan Tengri on February 7, 1992; the team included Valery Khrichtchatyi, Viktor Dedi, Yuri Moiseyev, Valdimir Suviga, Aleksandr Savin, Igor Putintsev and Malik Ismetov.

Austrian mountaineer and expedition leader Toni Dürnberger died while descending after having climbed Khan Tengri on 17 August 1992.

In 2004, more than a dozen mountaineers were killed in a large avalanche on the Pogrebetsky route, the most popular route on the mountain.

The peak appears on the 100 Kyrgyz som note.

See also 

 List of elevation extremes by country

Footnotes

External links
 
 
 Khan Tengri route maps
 International Mountaineering Camp Kan Tengri

Mountains of China
Mountains of Kazakhstan
Mountains of Kyrgyzstan
Issyk-Kul Region
Landforms of Almaty Region
Kazakhstan–Kyrgyzstan border
International mountains of Asia
Seven-thousanders of the Tian Shan
China–Kazakhstan border
China–Kyrgyzstan border
Border tripoints
Highest points of countries
Tengriism